Bloody Xmas is a mixtape by rapper Tony Yayo. The mixtape cover shows Young Buck, James Rosemond, The Game and Fat Joe's heads cut off by a saw. The mixtape features exclusive tracks from Tony Yayo with appearances by Red Cafe and Mavado.

Track list

References

2008 albums
Tony Yayo albums